Skórzyn  (1937-45 Teichwalde) is a village in the administrative district of Gmina Maszewo, within Krosno Odrzańskie County, Lubusz Voivodeship, in western Poland.

The former German chancellor Leo von Caprivi died here on 6 February 1899.

The village has a population of 260.

References

Villages in Krosno Odrzańskie County